Robert Bosch GmbH, commonly known as Bosch and stylized as BOSCH, is a German multinational engineering and technology company headquartered in Gerlingen, Germany. The company was founded by Robert Bosch in Stuttgart in 1886. Bosch is 94% owned by Robert Bosch Stiftung, a charitable institution. Although the charity is funded by owning the vast majority of shares, it has no voting rights and is involved in health and social causes unrelated to Bosch’s business.

Bosch's core operating areas are spread across four business sectors: mobility (hardware and software), consumer goods (including household appliances and power tools), industrial technology (including drive and control) and energy and building technology.

History

1886–1920

The company started in a backyard in Stuttgart-West as the Werkstätte für Feinmechanik und Elektrotechnik (Workshop for Precision Mechanics and Electrical Engineering) on 15 November 1886. The next year Bosch presented a low voltage magneto for gas engines.

From 1897, Bosch started installing magneto ignition devices into automobiles and became a supplier of an ignition system. In 1902, the chief engineer at Bosch, Gottlob Honold, unveiled the high-voltage magneto ignition system with spark plug.

In 1901, Bosch opened its first factory in Stuttgart. In 1906, the company produced its 100,000th magneto. In the same year, Bosch introduced the eight-hour day for workers. In 1910, the Feuerbach plant was founded and built close to Stuttgart. In this factory, Bosch started to produce generators and headlights "Bosch-Light" in 1914. the system had been presented in 1913.

The onset of motorization in road traffic meant that the company grew very rapidly after 1900. While Bosch had a workforce of 45 in 1901, it had grown to more than 1,000 by 1908.

In 1913, Bosch founded an apprentice workshop in order to recruit qualified young people for the production of automotive electrics. Bosch's international development began in 1898 with the opening of a branch in London, followed the next year by Paris, Vienna, and Budapest. By 1909, Bosch was represented by trading partners on every continent: in 1906 in New York (U.S.) and Johannesburg (South Africa), in 1907 in Sydney (Australia), in 1908 in Buenos Aires (Argentina), in 1909 in Shanghai (China), in 1910 in Rio de Janeiro (Brazil), and in 1911 in Tokyo (Japan). Bosch opened the first factory outside Germany in Paris in 1905, and the first on another continent in 1912 in Springfield, Massachusetts (USA).

In 1917, Bosch was transformed into a corporation and remained so until 1937, when Robert Bosch became the sole owner again after buying back his shares. In the process, the company became a limited liability company (GmbH).

1920s–1945 
After the First World War, Bosch lost most of its international holdings, including its U.S. factories. The company had to largely rebuild its international activities. This included opening up further South American and Asian regions. In 1922, for example, Illies & Company established a sales office for Bosch goods in Calcutta, India. In the years that followed, Bosch concluded contracts in Asia with sales partners in Malaysia, Singapore, Thailand, and what is now Indonesia, for example, and on the American continents with partners in Mexico, Peru, Colombia, and Ecuador.

In the 1920s, Bosch expanded its product range to include numerous automotive technology products that were required for cars in everyday use: electric horn (1921), windshield wipers (1926), and direction indicators ("trafficator", 1927).

And in 1927, Bosch launched injection pumps for diesel. Bosch bought the gas appliances production from Junkers & Co. in 1932, as a part of a diversification strategy. In 1932, the company developed its first electric drill and presented its first car radio. In 1933, Bosch presented its first electric refrigerator for private households.

The year 1933 marked the beginning of the darkest chapter in Bosch's corporate history. On the one hand, the company was systemically relevant as a motor vehicle supplier during the Nazi era, and the management behaved loyally toward the regime. On the other hand, with Robert Bosch's support, the company supported oppositional and anti-regime activities with the utmost secrecy.

Nazi collaboration 
In late 1933 negotiations between Robert Bosch AG and the Nazi Party began on relocating parts of armaments production to Germany's interior. Bosch founded two such alternative plants in 1935 and 1937: Dreilinden Maschinenbau GmbH in Kleinmachnow near Berlin and Elektro- und Feinmechanische Industrie GmbH (later Trillke-Werke GmbH) in Hildesheim. Both plants were used exclusively for armaments production. These "shadow factories" were built under great secrecy and in close cooperation with the Nazi authorities. In 1937, Bosch AG became a limited liability company (GmbH).

The Bosch subsidiary Dreilinden Maschinenbau GmbH (DLMG) in Kleinmachnow employed around 5,000 people, more than half of whom were forced laborers, prisoners of war, and female concentration camp prisoners, including many women from the Warsaw Uprising. They had to produce accessories for German Luftwaffe aircraft. In Hildesheim, a secret plant for the entire electrical equipment of tanks, tractors, and trucks of the Wehrmacht was built. In 1944, 4,290 men and women worked in the Trillke factory, 2,019 of whom were forced laborers, prisoners of war and military internees.  During the Second World War, there were at least 3000 workers at the mechanics division at the Bosch Hildesheim plant, almost all of them from nearby occupied countries; there are only 200 recorded German workers.

In the last years of the war, no new German tank ever drove without the starter elements from the Bosch factory in Hildesheim. Bosch also had a monopoly position in the outfitting of German Luftwaffe aircraft.

During the war, production was further decentralized, Bosch produced in an ever larger number of factories, and relocated parts of its production to 213 plants in more than 100 locations.

21st century
In 2001, Bosch acquired the Mannesmann Rexroth AG, which they later renamed to Bosch Rexroth AG. In the same year, the company opened a new testing center in Vaitoudden, close to Arjeplog in north Sweden. A new developing center in Abstatt, Germany followed in 2004.

In 2002, Bosch acquired Philips CSI, which at the time was manufacturing a broad range of professional communication and security products and systems including CCTV, congress and public address systems.

In the 2000's the company were responsible for inventing the electric hydraulic brake, the common rail fuel injection with piezo-injectors, the digital car radio with a disc drive, and the cordless screwdriver with a lithium-ion battery in 2003.

Bosch received the Deutsche Zukunftspreis (German Future Prize) from the German president in 2005 and 2008. A new development center was planned in 2008 in Renningen. In 2014, the first departments moved to the new center, while the remaining departments followed in 2015.

In 2006, Bosch acquired Telex Communications and Electro-Voice.

In 2009, Bosch invested about 3.6 billion Euro in development and research. Approximately 3900 patents are published per year. In addition to increasing energy efficiency by employing renewable energies, the company plans to invest into new areas such as biomedical engineering.

China is a both a market and a manufacturing location for Bosch. In 2012, Bosch had 34,000 employees and a revenue of 41.7 billion Yuan (about 5 billion Euro) in China.
 2012 – Purchased SPX Service Solutions
 2012 – Bosch sold its foundation brakes activities to KPS Capital Partners, that led to the establishment of Chassis Brakes International
 2013 – Bosch announced it would exit its solar business
 2014 – Bosch entered talks to acquire Red Bend Software.
 2014 – Bosch takes over 100% of the shares from the former BSH Bosch and Siemens Hausgeräte GmbH joint venture (home appliances)
 2014 – Bosch received the 2014 U.S. Smart Partner award for Physical Security from Ingram Micro Inc.
 2015 – Bosch takes over 100% of the shares of the former ZF Lenksysteme (Steering Systems) GmbH joint venture (was 50/50 with ZF Friedrichshafen)
 2015 – Bosch purchases Seeo, Inc, a start-up working on solid state lithium ion batteries.

Role in emission cheating software 
In 2006, Volkswagen executives asked Bosch for help in developing software for their emission defeat devices. Volkswagen is one of Bosch's biggest customers. Volkswagen engineers provided detailed specifications to Bosch, which wrote the necessary code. Bosch was apparently concerned about the legality of software and asked Volkswagen to assume responsibility if the fraud was discovered, but Volkswagen refused.

Starting in 2008, Bosch supplied approximately 17 million motor control and mixture control devices containing illegal software to various manufacturers both domestically and globally. With such software, the automobiles fitted with Bosch's devices emitted more nitrogen oxides than allowed under regulations.

On 1 February 2017, Bosch agreed to pay consumers in the United States $327.5 million as compensation for its role in devising the software. Bosch also provided emissions software for Fiat Chrysler's 3.0 L V6 diesel engine used in 100,000 model year 2014–2016 Grand Cherokee SUVs and Ram Trucks and agreed to pay affected consumers $27.5 million as part of a broader settlement in January 2019. In May 2019, Bosch paid another $100 million fine for its connection to the Dieselgate scandal.

Role in Astongate greenwashing campaign 

In 2020, Bosch funded the creation of a 20-page report entitled Decarbonising Road Transport: There Is No Silver Bullet, which was widely debunked for promoting misleading information about the CO2 emissions created in the manufacture of electric vehicles, following the UK's declaration to ban the sale of new internal combustion engine vehicles from 2030.

The report compared the emissions created in the production of the all-electric Polestar 2 car, which it claimed would emit 24 tonnes of CO2 over its life, with a petrol-powered Volvo XC40, which the report claimed would create 14 tonnes of CO2. Based on the comparison of these two cars alone the study promoted by Clarendon Communications claimed that all electric vehicles would need to drive  in order to offset the emissions from manufacture – when, in reality, a typical EV need only drive  in order to offset the emissions from manufacture.

While Bosch was a key funder of the report, the scandal became known as Astongate given the relationship between British automotive manufacturer, Aston Martin and Clarendon Communications, a shell company posing as a PR agency which set up to promote the report, and which was registered to James Michael Stephens – the Director Global Government & Corporate Affairs at Aston Martin Lagonda Ltd.

In January 2021, Volkswagen filed a $1.2 billion class-action against Bosch and Continental AG in the United States after VW was forced to reduce production due to a lack of automotive microchips. On January 26, 2021, the US Court of Appeals for the Ninth Circuit affirmed that Bosch won on all claims.

In January 2020, Bosch Packaging Technology became Syntegon.

In June 2021, Bosch christened its newly built semiconductor manufacturing plant in which it invested $1.2 billion, its largest-ever spending on a single project.

In April 2022, Bosch announced to acquire Five.ai, an autonomous driving startup.

in April 2022, Bosch announced it had acquired the Dresden-based MEMS micro speaker producer, Arioso Systems. The company will form part of Bosch Sensortec GmbH.

In July 2022, Bosch said the company is looking to invest approximately 3 billion euros into its semiconductor chip production and R&D over the next four years. They will be opening two new facilities for manufacturing a computer chip development in the cities of Dresden and Reutlingen. Chairman Stefan Hartung said the company is not interested in building cutting-edge semiconductor facilities but focuses on 40 and 200-nanometer chips used in the automotive industry.

Operations

The majority of Bosch Group businesses are grouped into the following four business sectors.

Mobility solutions

The Mobility Solutions business sector accounts for 60 percent of total sales in 2019. Its main areas of activity are injection technology and powertrain peripherals for internal-combustion engines, powertrain electrification, steering systems, safety and driver-assistance systems, infotainment technology as well as vehicle-to-vehicle and vehicle-to-infrastructure communication, repair-shop concepts, and technology and services for the automotive aftermarket.

Particular strategic priorities for the sector include transforming the powertrain and expanding the business in the areas of electrification, automated driving, new electrical and electronic architectures for vehicles, accessing adjacent market segments, and developing additional services.

The new Powertrain Solutions division was formed effective 1 January 2018, in order to develop powertrain technology products, regardless of the energy source. The new division resulted from the merger of the former Gasoline Systems and Diesel Systems divisions. It offers products for powertrain technology, from gasoline and diesel direct injection to electrified powertrains with battery systems and, in the future, it will offer fuel-cell technologies as well.

Brands within this sector include:
 AutoCrew
 Bosch Car Service
 ITK Engineering
 Robinair
 HC Cargo
 Zexel
 ETAS

Industrial technology
In the 2019 business year, the Industrial Technology business sector generated roughly 10 percent of total Bosch Group sales. The sector includes the Drive and Control Technology division, whose products include customized drive, control, and linear motion for factory automation, plant construction and engineering, and mobile machinery.

The second division, Packaging Technology, provides process and packaging for the pharmaceuticals and foodstuffs industries. Its range includes stand-alone machines, systems, and service. In 2018, Bosch decided to look for a new owner for this business. Bosch's in-house provider of assembly systems, Robert Bosch Manufacturing Solutions GmbH, Stuttgart, remains part of the Bosch Group; up to now, it has been part of the Packaging Technology division.

In addition, the Bosch Connected Industry business unit, which develops software and carries out Industry 4.0 projects for internal and external customers, has been part of the Industrial Technology business sector since the start of 2018.

In January 2020, Bosch Packaging Technology became Syntegon

Consumer goods
The Consumer Goods business sector contributed some 23 percent of total Bosch Group sales in 2019. Its Power Tools division is a supplier of power tools, power-tool accessories, and measuring technology. In addition to power tools such as hammer drills, cordless screwdrivers, and jigsaws, its products also include gardening equipment such as lawnmowers, hedge trimmers, and high-pressure cleaners. One of the division's focal points is convenient, high-performance cordless tools, and increasingly also web-enabled tools and services.

Overlapping with its mobility interests, it provides traction motors for electric bicycles with sophisticated control systems.

The Consumer Goods business sector also includes BSH Hausgeräte GmbH, which offers a broad range of modern, energy-efficient, and increasingly connected household appliances. Its products range from washing machines and tumble dryers through refrigerators and freezers, stoves and ovens, and dishwashers, to small appliances such as vacuum cleaners, coffee makers, and food processors.

Brands within this sector include:
 Dremel
 Siemens (under licence)
 Neff GmbH
 Gaggenau Hausgeräte
 Thermador

Energy and building technology

In 2019, the Energy and Building Technology business sector generated 7 percent of total Bosch Group sales. Its Building Technologies division (formerly Security Systems) has two areas of business: the global product business for security and communications, and the regional integrator business. The latter offers services for building security, energy efficiency, and building automation in selected countries. Both units focus on commercial applications. The products encompass video-surveillance, intrusion-detection, fire-detection, and voice-alarm systems, as well as access-control and professional audio and conference systems.

The Thermotechnology division offers systems for air conditioning, hot water, and decentralized energy management. It provides heating systems and energy management for residential buildings, water heaters, and commercial and industrial heating and air-conditioning systems.

The Bosch Global Service Solutions division offers outsourcing for business processes and services, primarily for customers in the automotive, travel, and logistics industries and in information and communications technology. Within Bosch, it also provides shared-service functions.

Robert Bosch Smart Home GmbH offers web-enabled, app-controlled products for the home.

Brands within this sector:
 Dynacord
 Electro-Voice
 Telex
 Worcester Bosch
 Junkers

Other business areas
The Bosch Group also operates in other business areas that are not assigned to a particular sector.

Bosch Healthcare Solutions GmbH is a wholly owned subsidiary of Robert Bosch GmbH. The subsidiary was established in 2015. The business offers products and services in the area of healthcare and medical technology. In March 2020, Bosch Healthcare Solutions announced that it has developed a diagnostic tool for detecting the coronavirus SARS-CoV-2 responsible for the COVID-19 pandemic in under three hours. According to Bosch, the test can be performed directly at the point of care, eliminating the need to transport samples.

The Grow Platform GmbH is the legal entity of Grow and a 100% subsidiary of the Bosch corporation. Grow is an internal start-up incubator.

Robert Bosch Venture Capital GmbH (Rbvc, also known as Bosch Ventures) is the corporate venture capital company of the Bosch Group. RBVC invests worldwide in innovative start-up companies. Its investment activities focus on technology companies working in areas of business of current and future relevance for Bosch, above all, automation and electrification, energy efficiency, enabling technologies, and healthcare systems. RBVC also invests in services and business models as well as new materials that are relevant to the above-mentioned areas of business.

Locations

Through a complex network of over 440 subsidiaries and regional entities, the company operates in over 60 countries worldwide. Including sales and service partners, Bosch's global manufacturing, engineering, and sales network covers nearly every country in the world. At 125 locations across the globe, Bosch employs roughly 64,500 associates in research and development.

British operations
In the UK, Bosch has its corporate head office in Denham, Buckinghamshire, and employs circa. 5200 associates. There are also around 40 other Bosch Group locations throughout the country, including Coventry, Glenrothes, St Neots, Stockport, Stowmarket, Liverpool, Milton Keynes, Worcester and York.

Alongside sales and support functions for all Bosch business sectors in the region, the company also manufactures boiler systems, mobile hydraulics, packaging machinery alongside lawn and garden products in the UK.

In March 2019, Bosch opened its London Connectory, a Shoreditch-based "co-innovation space" open to partners from the public, private and academic sectors, from start-ups to multinational organisations.

North American operations

In North America, Robert Bosch LLC (a wholly owned Bosch subsidiary) has corporate headquarters in Farmington Hills, Michigan. Three Research Technology Centers are located in Pittsburgh, Pennsylvania, Sunnyvale, California, and Cambridge, Massachusetts. Factories and distribution facilities are located in Mt. Prospect, Illinois; Hoffman Estates, Illinois; Broadview, Illinois; Kentwood, Michigan; Warren, Michigan; Owatonna, Minnesota; Waltham, Massachusetts; Clarksville, Tennessee; Anderson, South Carolina; Charleston, South Carolina; New Bern, North Carolina; and 11 other cities. There are also two corporate sites in Brazil and ten in Mexico where a central purchasing office for all divisions of Bosch Group is located in Broadview, Illinois. In North America, Bosch employs about 24,750 people in 80 locations, generating $8.8 billion in sales in 2006.

In May 2015, Bosch Security Systems opened its newly constructed distribution center in Greer, South Carolina. The distribution center adds more than 50 new associates in the state and will receive, store and ship more than 50,000 different products for video surveillance, intrusion and fire detection, access control and management systems and professional audio and conference systems.

In 2017, Bosch launched its first co-creation IoT innovation space in the world, the  Connectory. A partnership with  1871, it is located within the Merchandise Mart in downtown Chicago, Illinois.

Indian operations 

Bosch entered India in 1922, when Illies & Company set up a sales office in Calcutta. For three decades, the company operated in the Indian market only through imports. In 1951, the Motor Industries Company Ltd. (MICO) was founded, with Bosch instantly buying 49% of its stock. MICO became the sole distributor and, after the Indian state implemented restrictive import regulations, a factory was set up at Adugodi, Bangalore in 1953, to manufacture various products with Bosch licensing. From this point onward, vocational training took place as well, culminating in the creation of a Vocational Centre in 1960. By 1961, 2,000 people worked at the Bangalore plant, which had already started export business, and 57.5% of MICO shares had been bought by Bosch. This was followed by increased investments into MICO plants in India in the late 1960s and early 1970s; a second plant was installed in Nasik in 1969–1971, a third in Naganathapura in 1988.  In the late 1980s, the second-largest contingent of Bosch employees outside of Germany was based in India until eventually, in 2008, MICO was renamed Bosch Limited.

Bosch India has a turnover of over US$3 billion and over 31,000 employees spread across 10 locations and 7 application development centers. 84% of Bosch India revenues come from its automotive business, with the remaining 16% split between its non-automotive businesses that include packaging, energy and building, power tools and consumer retail. Bosch also has R & D facilities in Pune, Hyderabad, Coimbatore and Bangalore, India. This is Bosch's largest R & D operation outside its home market of Germany. In September 2014, Bosch announced the launch of a locally developed eye-care solution in India. The company's new eye screening and detection system offers a combination of hardware and software and provides affordable eye care.

Bosch India is listed on the Indian stock exchanges and has a market capitalization of over US$12 billion.

In 2022, Bosch's engineering and software arm Robert Bosch Engineering and Business Solutions (abbreviated as RBEI), changed its name to Bosch Global Software Technologies.

Joint ventures

BSH Hausgeräte

BSH Hausgeräte GmbH, in which Bosch acquired all shares in 2014, is one of the world's top three companies in the household appliances industry. In Germany and Western Europe, BSH is the market leader. It includes the principal brand names Bosch and Siemens, Gaggenau, Balay, Neff, Thermador, Constructa, Viva and Ufesa brands, and further six regional brands. Bosch household appliances for the North American market are mainly manufactured at its factory near New Bern, North Carolina.

EM-motive
Daimler AG and Bosch established a 50:50 joint venture (JV) to develop and manufacture electric motors in 2011. The JV, called EM-motive GmbH, manufactures traction motors for electric, fuel cell and extended-range vehicles at a facility in Hildesheim, Germany.

In 2019 Bosch acquired the remaining shares and assumed full control of the company.

Purolator filters
Bosch co-owned Purolator Filters in a joint venture with Mann+Hummel until 2013. In 2013 the Mann+Hummel Group acquired Bosch's stake.

SB LiMotive

In June 2008 Bosch formed SB LiMotive, a 50:50 joint company with Samsung SDI. The company held ground breaking ceremony for a 28.000 m2 lithium-ion battery cell manufacturing plant in September 2009 and it is scheduled to start production for hybrid vehicles in 2011 and for electric vehicles in 2012. The plant will generate 1,000 jobs in Ulsan, Korea in addition to the 500 employees in Korea, Germany and the United States. SB LiMotive was officially ended in September 2012 with both companies focusing on automotive batteries alone.

Static ADAS Calibration
In October 2020, Bosch and Mitchell International paired up to develop the MD-500, a wireless tablet that repair planners can use to link directly to OEM repair procedures from Diagnostic Trouble Codes (DTCs), automatically upload pre-scan and post-scans, and write estimates and calibration reports. Bosch and Mitchell launched the MD-TS21, a target system which permits repair facilities to quickly and accurately calibrate blind-spot monitors, front-facing camera, and radar sensors in automobile models with ADAS, in February 2021.

Corporate affairs
Robert Bosch GmbH, including its wholly owned subsidiaries, is unusual in that it is an extremely large, privately owned corporation that is almost entirely (92%) owned by a charitable foundation. Thus, while most of the profits are invested back into the corporation to build for the future and sustain growth, nearly all of the profits distributed to shareholders are devoted to humanitarian causes.

As shown in the diagram above, the Robert Bosch Stiftung (Robert Bosch Foundation) holds 92% of the shares of Robert Bosch GmbH, but no voting rights. The Robert Bosch Industrietreuhand KG (Robert Bosch Industrial Trust KG), with old members of the company management, agents of the Bosch family, and other eminent people from the industry (such as Jürgen Hambrecht, CEO of BASF), have 93% of the votes, but no shares (0.01%). The remaining 8% of shares and 7% of voting-rights are held by the descendants of the company founder Robert Bosch.

Bosch invests 9% of its revenue on research and development, nearly double the industry average of 4.7%.

Accreditations
Some Bosch locations are ISO 9001 (quality) and ISO 14001 (environmental protection) certified. In addition to that, their management is compliant with OHSAS 18001.

Environmental practices and initiatives
In May 2019, Bosch said it plans to be "fully carbon-neutral” by 2020 by investing in clean electricity and a carbon offset program.

Partnership with universities 
Bosch has formed a strategic alliance with the Technische Universität Darmstadt.

See also

 Continental AG
 Knorr-Bremse
 Siemens

References

External links

 
 

 
Auto parts suppliers of Germany
Automotive companies of Germany
Engineering companies of Germany
Electronics companies of Germany
Tool manufacturing companies of Germany
Home appliance brands
Home appliance manufacturers of Germany
Heating, ventilation, and air conditioning companies
Power tool manufacturers
Plug-in hybrid vehicle industry
Multinational companies headquartered in Germany
Manufacturing companies established in 1886
1886 establishments in Germany
Privately held companies of Germany
German brands
German companies established in 1886
Electric motor manufacturers
Pump manufacturers